The Nash Metropolitan is an American automobile that was assembled in England and marketed from 1953 until 1961.

It conforms to two classes of vehicle: economy car and subcompact car. In today's US terminology the Metropolitan is a “subcompact”, but this category was not yet in use when the car was made. At that time, it was variously categorized, for example as a "small automobile" as well as an "economy car".

The Metropolitan was also sold as a Hudson when Nash and Hudson merged in 1954 to form the American Motors Corporation (AMC), and later as a standalone marque during the Rambler years, as well as in the United Kingdom and other markets.

Design
While most domestic automobile makers were following a "bigger-is-better" philosophy, Nash Motor Company executives were examining the market to offer American buyers an economical transportation alternative. The Metropolitan was designed in Kenosha, Wisconsin. It was patterned from a concept car, the NXI (Nash Experimental International), that was built by Detroit-based independent designer William J. Flajole for Nash-Kelvinator. It was designed as the second car in a two car family, for Mom taking the kids to school or shopping or for Dad to drive to the railroad station to ride to work: the "commuter/shopping car" with resemblance to the big Nash, but the scale was tiny as the Met's wheelbase was shorter than the Volkswagen Beetle's.

The NXI design study incorporated many innovative features and attempted to make use of interchangeable front and rear components (the symmetrical door skins were the only interchangeable items used in production). Although more complex, the new vehicle also incorporated Nash's advanced single-unit (unit body) construction. It was displayed at a number of "surviews" (survey-previews), commencing on 4 January 1950, at the Waldorf-Astoria Hotel, New York, to gauge the reaction of the American motoring public to a car of this size. The result of these "surviews" convinced Nash that there was indeed a market for such a car if it could be built at a competitive price.

A series of prototypes followed that incorporated many of the improvements from the "surviews" that included roll-up glass side windows, a more powerful engine, and a column-mounted transmission shifter with bench seat (rather than bucket-type seats with floor shift fitted in the concept car). The model was named NKI (for Nash-Kelvinator International), and it featured revised styling incorporating a hood blister and rear wheel cutouts.

Nash was positioning this new product for the emerging postwar market for "personal use" autos. These specific use vehicles were as a second car for women or an economical commuter car. The Metropolitan was also aimed at returning Nash to overseas markets. However, Mason and Nash's management calculated that it would not be viable to build such a car from scratch in the U.S. because the tooling costs would have been prohibitive. The only cost-effective option was to build overseas using existing mechanical components (engine, transmission, rear end, suspension, brakes, electrical), leaving only the tooling cost for body panels and other unique components.

With this in mind, Nash Motors negotiated with several European companies. On 5 October 1952, they announced that they had selected the Austin Motor Company (by then part of BMC) and Fisher & Ludlow (which also became part of BMC in September 1953, later operating under the name Pressed Steel Fisher), both English companies based in Birmingham, England and vicinity. Fisher & Ludlow would produce the bodywork, while the mechanicals would be provided as well as the final assembly were to be performed by the Austin Motor Company. This was the first time an American-designed car, to be exclusively marketed in North America, had been entirely built in Europe. It became a captive import – a foreign-built vehicle sold and serviced by Nash (and later by American Motors) through its dealer distribution system. It is believed that the first pre-production prototype was completed by Austin on 2 December 1952. In all, five pre-production prototypes were built by Austin Motors and tested prior to the start of production. The total tooling cost amounted to US$1,018,475.94, (Austin: US$197,849.14; Fisher & Ludlow: US$820,626.80) which was a fraction of the tooling cost for a totally U.S.-built vehicle.

The styling for all Nash vehicles at that time was an amalgam of designs from Pinin Farina and his design house of Italy and the in-house Nash design team. The different models from Ambassador down to the Metropolitan utilized similar design features including fully enclosed front wheels, notched "pillow" style door pressing, bar-style grille, etc.

The new Metropolitan was made in two body designs: convertible and hardtop. All came with several standard features that were optional on most cars of the era. Among these factory-installed benefits for customers were a map light, electric windshield wipers, cigar lighter, and even a "continental-type" rear-mounted spare tire with cover. To give a "luxury" image to the interior, "Bedford cord" upholstery trimmed with leather was used (similar to larger Nash vehicles). An AM radio, "Weather Eye" heater, and whitewall tires were offered as optional extras for the U.S. market. (It is unlikely that a Metropolitan could have been purchased without a heater and radio, as all vehicles left the factory with both items fitted.)

The Metropolitan was the first postwar American car that was marketed specifically to women. The Dodge La Femme was introduced one year later. The first spokesperson for the car was Miss America 1954, Evelyn Ay Sempier, and the car was prominently advertised in Women's Wear Daily. American Motors' marketing brochures described the new model as "America's entirely new kind of car" (1955), "Luxury in Miniature" (1959), and "crafted for personal transportation" (1960).

First reviews
Initial reviews of the Metropolitan were mixed. However, owners of the cars reported that the "Metropolitan is a good thing in a small package".

Automotive industry veteran and the largest publisher of automotive books at the time, Floyd Clymer, took several Metropolitans through his tests. He "abused" a 1954 Metropolitan convertible and "got the surprise of my life" when its "performance was far better than I expected", that he "felt very safe in the car", and that "it may well be that Nash has started a new trend in American motoring. Perhaps the public is now getting ready to accept a small car". Clymer also took a 1957 Metropolitan hardtop through a grueling  road test that even took him  up Pikes Peak. He summed up his experience that "I can not praise the Metropolitan too highly. It is a fascinating little car to drive, its performance is far better than one would expect, and the ride is likewise more than expected".

According to Collectible Auto magazine, the car was described in Car Lifes review as "a big car in miniature" that was "fun to drive" and "ideal for a second car in the family," while Motor Trend was not alone in regarding the rear "utility" seat as "a joke".

Motor Trend praised the car's economy: its test Metropolitan returned:
 "in traffic".

Mechanix Illustrated editor Tom McCahill wrote: "It is not a sports car by the weirdest torturing of the imagination but it is a fleet, sporty little bucket which should prove just what the doctor ordered for a second car, to be used either for a trip to the movies or for a fast run to a penicillin festival." He added that it was a "nice-handling car with plenty of control and amazing dig, considering it is powered by a small Austin A-40 engine" and that the finish was "very nice", although having no trunk opening except by pulling down the back of the rear seat “poses a problem". His test car accelerated from 0 to 60 mph in 19.3 seconds and could exceed .

A Road & Track road test recorded acceleration from 0–60 mph in 22.4 seconds, "almost half of the VW’s 39.2". Road & Tracks testers also said that the car had “more than its share of roll and wallow on corners” and there was "little seat-of-the-pants security when the rear end takes its time getting back in line".

Road Test magazine wrote in 1954 that "on roadability and responsive handling, the Met shines. It also offers easy maintenance and downright stinginess when it comes to gasoline consumption. Also, it's literally a brute for punishment. On several occasions I took familiar corners at speeds half again what I would dare to use in some cars of twice the weightproof that proper weight distribution, low center of gravity and well engineered suspension have more to do with roadability than massiveness, weight and long wheelbases. Admittedly, the short wheelbased Met does pitch moderately on very rough roads, but the sensitivity and ease of steering make driving a pleasure."

Production for U.S.

Series I

Production at Austin's Longbridge factory started in October 1953 (Commencing VIN1001). Nicknamed the "baby Nash", the cars were tiny. The two models, a convertible and a hardtop, were powered by the OHV  straight-4 Austin 'A40' series engine (as used in the Austin A40 Devon/Dorset) driving the rear wheels through a three-speed manual transmission. The initial order was for 10,000 units, with an option to increase the order if sales were sufficient.

The new model was initially to be called the "NKI Custom", but the name was changed to "Metropolitan" just two months before its public release. New chrome nameplates with the "Metropolitan" name were made to fit into the same holes as the "NKI Custom" script on the passenger side front fender. Nash dealers had to rebadge the early cars that came with the "NKI Custom" name, but some factory manuals had already been prepared and distributed to service departments with the NKI name. The first examples badged as Nash went on sale on March 19, 1954, in the U.S. and Canada. Autocar said that "at a production rate of less than 400 cars a week ... it was hardly going to be a runaway best seller."

In surveys, Americans had affirmed a desire for economy cars, but in practice, they bought the Metropolitan in relatively small numbers. Although Nash merged with Hudson in 1954, and marketed the car as a Hudson Metropolitan in 1955, "demand never took off from the original level", primarily because the Metropolitan was slow by North American standards. In the first month of sales, 862 Metropolitans were sold in U.S. and Canada, while in the first six months a total of 7,042 were sold. A further order was placed with Austin.

Available exterior colors were P903 "Spruce Green", P904 "Canyon Red", P905 "Caribbean Blue", or P906 "Croton Green", with P907 "Mist Grey" as a contrast color for the hardtops. P906 "Croton Green" was dropped as a color option in April 1954. Cars incorporated the Nash logo on their grille badge, hubcaps, horn button, and spare wheel cover. The suggested retail price (MSRP) for Series I (also known as NK1) models was US$1,445 (Hardtop) and $1,469 (Convertible). Adding a radio and a heater pushed the price above $1,500: at the time Volkswagen's Bug/Beetle was being offered at $1,425.

In May 1954, Nash-Kelvinator Corporation announced that it had merged with the Hudson Motor Company to form American Motors Corporation (AMC). Thus by August 1954, Metropolitans also became available from Hudson dealers. These Hudson Metropolitans carried a Hudson grille badge, hubcaps incorporating an "M" logo, a "bulls-eye" horn button design, and a plain spare wheel cover.

In Dec.1953, George Mason took two Metropolitans to Raleigh Speedway in North Carolina for some tests. The first Metropolitan did a 24-hour endurance run, going a total of  without the need for a tune up, while the second car was put to a 24-hour fuel economy run. It averaged .

Series II

Other modifications that were incorporated at this time were a new gearbox and hydraulic actuation for the clutch (Series I models used a mechanical clutch linkage). The change to a new engine and gearbox added  to the weight. This model is referred to as Series II or NK2 (Commencing with Vehicle identification number (VIN) E11001 on August 19, 1954).

Series III

November 1955 saw the start of Metropolitan Series III (NK3) production (Commencing with VIN E21008 on 28 November 1955). Polished stainless steel sweep-spears on the body sides allowed a new two-tone finish to be incorporated, which had the cosmetic effect of lowering, slimming, and lengthening the car. The new exterior colors were P905 "Caribbean Green", P910 "Sunburst Yellow", and P911 "Coral Red" with P909 "Snowberry White" as a contrast. The grille was also redesigned, and the hood had its non-functional hood scoop removed. American Motors changed the designation to "Metropolitan 1500" to differentiate it from the earlier  models. The interior was also changed to incorporate a "houndstooth" check material for the seats trimmed with white vinyl. The dashboard was also now painted black, rather than the body color as was the case for Series I and II Metropolitans.

The MSRP for Series III models was $1,527 (Hardtop) and $1,551 (Convertible). After VIN E35133 (16 April 1957) the exterior colors were changed to P910 "Sunburst Yellow", P912 "Berkshire Green", and P913 "Mardi-Gras Red" with P914 "Frost White" as a contrast. After VIN E45912 (9 January 1958), the color P910 "Sunburst Yellow" was replaced by P915 "Autumn Yellow" and P908 "Classic Black" was added to the available exterior colors.

In September 1957, AMC announced that it was dropping the Nash and Hudson brand names. The Metropolitan was subsequently marketed under the "Metropolitan" name only and sold through Rambler dealers. It is believed that the Nash and Hudson Grille medallions were discontinued around October 1956 (VIN E28326); they were replaced with the "M" style grille medallion.

Series IV

January 1959 saw the start of Metropolitan Series IV (NK4) production (Commencing with VIN E59048 on 12 January 1959). This major redesign saw the addition of an external decklid (previous models only allowed access to the trunk through the rear seatback), one-piece rear window, and vent windows. The additional features added  to the weight. Exterior color options were the same as for Series III. The interior now used a diamond pattern for the seats, with white vinyl trim. The MSRP for Series IV models was $1,672.60 (Hardtop) and $1,696.80 (Convertible).

Sales rose to 22,209 units in 1959, the Metropolitan's best-selling year, promoting it to second place behind Volkswagen in sales of cars imported to the U.S. American Motors' advertising made much of this ranking, while omitting mention that the Volkswagen outsold the Metropolitan by 5 to 1.

Production ceased in April 1961 (final VIN — E95981, built April 19, 1961). Sales of the existing inventory continued until March 1962.

A station wagon version was contemplated by AMC, and two prototypes were built, but the project was abandoned. One of the two prototypes has been restored and is on display at a Metropolitan restoration facility in North Hollywood, California.

Approximately 95,000 Metropolitans were sold in the United States and Canada, making it one of the top-selling cars to be imported into those countries at the time, and its sales in 1959 helped to spur the introduction of the Big Three's (General Motors, Ford, and Chrysler) new compact models.

Yearly shipments

Production dates
To establish the production date for a Metropolitan (U.S. and Canadian models only), check the VIN or Serial number on a data plate affixed to the firewall. Chassis numbers after 4781 are prefixed by the letter "E". Check this number against the list below, to establish an approximate production date. NB. Since the cars took at least six weeks to be shipped from the Longbridge factory to the U.S. distribution network, the actual titled date will not be the same as the production date.

Production for foreign markets

In October 1956, Austin Motor Company obtained permission from American Motors to sell the Metropolitans in overseas countries where AMC did not have a presence. The early brochures for the Austin Metropolitans used a reversed photograph to show an apparently right-hand drive (RHD) car parked in an English country town (Chipping Campden), because only left-hand drive vehicles were available at the time the photos were taken.

From December 1956, production of Austin Metropolitans began, and from April 2, 1957, approximately 9,400 additional units were sold in overseas markets that included the United Kingdom and New Zealand. List prices for the UK Series III models were £713 17s 0d for the Hardtop and £725 2s 0d for the Convertible. An estimated 1,200 Metropolitans were sold there in four years, according to several published sources. However, one British journalist has estimated the figure at around 5,000. Markedly American, the styling was considered outlandish compared with the more sober British-styled models in the British Motor Corporation lineup.

Only Series III and Series IV Metropolitans were produced for sale in the UK. (The first Metropolitans sold in the UK were sold only to American and Canadian servicemen stationed in the UK.) Series III models carried the prefix HD6 (Convertible) or HE6 (Hardtop). Some very early Series III models carried the prefix HNK3H or HNK3HL (L=Left-Hand Drive). The prefix is thought to indicate "Home Nash Kelvinator Series 3 H=1400-1999cc (Metropolitan=1500cc)". UK Series III sales ran from April 1957 to February 1959. Series IV models, which carried the prefix A-HJ7 (Convertible) or A-HP7 (Hardtop), were sold from September 1960 to February 1961. The Metropolitan was not available for UK sales between February 1959 and September 1960, since all production during that time was for US & Canadian dealers. When sales in the UK resumed they were sold through Austin dealers at listed prices of £707 6s 8d for the Hardtop and £732 2s 6d for the Convertible. Austin was dropped from the name, which now became simply "Metropolitan", and the cars carried no Austin badges although they had Austin Company chassis plates. Despite this, the car remained known, by trade and public alike, as the Austin Metropolitan, often shortened to Austin Metro in common parlance. The 'Metro' tag was adopted by BMC (later British Leyland) as a house name, re-emerging in 1980 on the Austin (mini) Metro.

In May 1960, Car Mart Ltd. (a large Austin dealership in London, UK) presented Princess Margaret as a wedding present with a specially prepared Metropolitan finished in black with gold trim and gold leather interior. It was stolen in London in February 1961.

As a result of low sales, production of the Austin Metropolitan ended in February 1961. An additional two "one-offs" were built in March and April after serial Metropolitan production ended. The final car had a VIN of A-HP7 150301. Total Austin Metropolitan production has been estimated at between 9,384 and 9,391 cars.

Metropolitans were sold new in right-hand-drive in New Zealand as "Nash". The models never made it to neighboring Australia.

Epilogue

Faced with increasing competition from AMC's own Rambler American models, as well as newly introduced compact cars from the Big Three, the Metropolitan lost market appeal. The last Metropolitan body was made by Fisher & Ludlow on 10 April 1961. US-bound Metropolitan production ended in April 1961, as a result of its "marginal sales plus the fact that a four or five-passenger Rambler American could be purchased for only about $100 more".

The Metropolitan "was a car that appealed to an eclectic mix of Americans" because it was "economical, yet a joy to drive", and it has been described as "pure automotive whimsy". It also "swam against nearly every current of American car design".

Police market
Right-hand drive models were marketed by AMC to U.S. police departments for use in parking enforcement and other urban duties. Comparing the car to police motorcycles, an AMC brochure advertised superior all-weather protection, cost-effectiveness and storage space, and also the safety of single-unit construction.

The Franklin Mint produced a die-cast toy model of a 1956 Metropolitan in a police car version. Among its features are a police hat and handcuffs on the passenger's seat, as well as a fire extinguisher on the floor.

Astra-Gnome
Industrial designer Richard Arbib designed the Astra-Gnome “Time and Space Car”, a design concept influenced by space travel forms. The vehicle was featured on the September 3, 1956 cover of Newsweek magazine and exhibited at the 1956 New York International Auto Show. Arbib modified a 1955 Nash Metropolitan and it was his vision of what an automobile would look like in the year 2000. Among the features were a "celestial time-zone clock permitting actual flight-type navigation". The car is restored and kept at a museum in California.

Metropolitan Club (AMC)
Almost from the beginning of sales of the Metropolitan, American Motors received many letters and photographs from Metropolitan owners with stories of their good experiences with their cars. Some of these comments were used in later brochures for the Metropolitan. In January 1957, James W. Watson (AMC's Sales Manager for the Metropolitan) decided to initiate a "Metropolitan Club" to channel this enthusiasm, and hopefully increase Metropolitan sales. He reasoned that personal recommendation was a powerful marketing tool.

All owners of Metropolitans could apply to join the club, and members received a membership card, membership certificate, and a metal badge to attach to their vehicle. From May 1957, a magazine was circulated to members called "The Met Letter". In total, 16 magazines were produced from May 1957 (Volume 1, Number 1) to January 1962 (Volume 4, Number 3). The magazine consisted of articles and photographs submitted by members, as well as maintenance and editorial comments from American Motors. Members who recruited additional Metropolitan buyers were rewarded with a special gold anodized "Metropolitan Club" badge.

The club was disbanded around May 1962, when the supply of new Metropolitans was exhausted. Floyd Clymer, the motoring journalist and passionate supporter of the Metropolitan concept, attempted to keep the Metropolitan Club going for a short while after this time.

Collectibility

The "Metropolitan's staying power and its never-ending cuteness" have earned it "a place among the Greatest Cars of All Time" in the opinion of automotive writer Jack Nerad, a former editor of Motor Trend magazine: "No, the Metropolitan didn't come from a top-of-the-line manufacturer. No, it doesn't have a proud racing history. And, no, it wasn't built in huge numbers. But [it] possesses an ageless, cuddly quality that has made it a perennial favorite of car lovers and car agnostics alike." Nerad added: "If you wanted to ... wring the Met through its paces, you would be rewarded with a 0–60 miles per hour acceleration time of nearly 30 seconds. The Met was reasonably light at approximately 1800 pounds, but that weight was squared off against 42 horsepower."

In the opinion of syndicated auto journalist and author Bill Vance, the  Metropolitan "was quite a stylish little car" that was "ahead of its time" and performed well against its competition.

Brian Sewell cites the  version as the one "now perversely recognized as a collector's car", and says that the Metropolitan is "worth a moment's consideration, for in the history of the post-war American car industry it was the only genuine attempt to provide the market there with a mass-produced small, cheap car that could hold its own in urban traffic and slot into parking spaces far too small for even the smallest Ford or Chevrolet ... [but] the steering, dreadfully hampered by the enclosure of the front wheels, is so insensitive, and the turning circle so wide, that parking is a wretched business, the slack response of the huge steering-wheel a feature common in lumbering US cars of the period."

By British standards it looked "awful", according to Autocar, but Nash were "very pleased with it".

In 1961, the British auto magazine The Autocar tested a 1959 model whose odometer showed , and recorded a “reasonable” cruising speed of 60 mph, “fairly high” oil consumption of 125 miles per pint, “adequately good” roadholding, “pronounced understeer” in cornering, “good directional stability,” “decidedly vague steering,” a turning circle that was “stately for such a small car,” brakes that were “effective,” and remarked on the “unnecessarily high position of the steering-wheel,” which interfered with the driver's view of the road. The test car accelerated from 0–60 mph in 22.4 seconds, and its time for the standing-start quarter-mile was 21.9 seconds.

Metropolitans have the very soft ride preferred by Americans at the time, instead of the firmer suspension preferred in Europe. Markedly American, the styling was considered outlandish compared with the more sober British-styled models in the British Motor Corporation lineup. Brian Sewell commented in 2007 that the car was "damned" in England "as a preposterous aberration incorporating the worst of everything American".

One marque enthusiast says that Nash's subcompact was "the Smart car of the '50s". Parts are "relatively easy" to obtain and the car is "easy to work on".

Ken Gross, a director of the Petersen Automotive Museum, noted that "the softly sprung Met wallows like most larger American cars of its day," and he has warned against "rust, especially in the floor pan and lower fenders," and "electrical gremlins". British-made mechanical parts were available on the unspecified date of his article's publication, but he said that sheet metal was "a challenge".

Sewell advises buying the open version in "as late a model as you can (it ceased production in 1961)this has slightly more panache, and with the hood down it's much easier to load [at the supermarket]".

"While there are still good deals to be had on Metropolitans, their values have quietly but sharply escalated in the last five years while other 1960s American collector cars have leveled off or simply remained flat ... Parts and support are not a problem with these cars; returning all the waves and smiles you'll get driving a Met can be tiring though."

Some owners modify their Metropolitans. More extreme modifications have included conversion into a pickup truck, station wagon and stretch limousine, installation of a V8 engine, and conversion into a "Metro-Sled" with a rear-mounted snowmobile engine driving twin tracks. Some cars that were originally hardtops have been converted to convertibles.

There are active clubs for Metropolitan owners and enthusiasts. New, used, and reproduction examples of various parts and accessories are available.

The name was reserved as a House Name by BMC (later British Leyland) and re-emerged years later, in abbreviated form, on the Austin Mini-Metro. Amongst UK enthusiasts the original Metropolitan had, generally speaking, been unofficially dubbed the Austin Metro.

Notable owners

Jimmy Buffett
Bridget Fonda
Greg Gutfeld
Steve Jobs
Sarah "Bogi" Lateiner
Princess Margaret
Paul Newman
Elvis Presley
Graham Stark

Notes

References

External links

 
Austin Memories — History of Austin and Longbridge
History and details of the Metropolitan
Literature for the Metropolitan
UK Metropolitan Club Website
US Metropolitan Club Website
Pacific Northwest Club Website

Metropolitan
Coupés
Convertibles
Police vehicles
Subcompact cars
Cars introduced in 1953
1960s cars
Rear-wheel-drive vehicles